is a Japanese film director, producer, screenwriter, animator, author, and manga artist. A co-founder of Studio Ghibli, a film and animation studio, he has attained international acclaim as a masterful storyteller and as a maker of anime feature films. His works are characterized by the recurrence of progressive themes, such as environmentalism, pacifism, feminism, love and family. His films' protagonists are often strong girls or young women, and several of his films present morally ambiguous antagonists with redeeming qualities.

In the course of his career, Miyazaki has received multiple awards and nominations. His first feature films, The Castle of Cagliostro and Nausicaä of the Valley of the Wind, earned him the Ōfuji Noburō Award at the Mainichi Film Awards in 1979 and 1984, respectively. His film Laputa: Castle in the Sky won Best Anime at the Anime Grand Prix in 1986, and My Neighbor Totoro won Best Photography at the Japan Academy Prize in 1989. He received several awards for his work on Kiki's Delivery Service in 1990, including Best Japanese Film at the Golden Gross Awards and the Special Award at the Japan Academy Prize. Porco Rosso also won the Mainichi Film Award for Best Animation Film in 1993.

Miyazaki's film Princess Mononoke was the first animated film to win the Japan Academy Prize for Picture of the Year; its distribution to the Western world greatly increased Ghibli's popularity and influence outside Japan, and his 2001 film Spirited Away won the Academy Award for Best Animated Feature at the 75th Academy Awards. His 2004 film Howl's Moving Castle and 2009 film Ponyo received several awards, including Animation of the Year at the Tokyo Anime Awards, and both were nominated for the Annie Award for Directing in a Feature Production. His 2013 film The Wind Rises was also highly awarded; it received Animation of the Year from the Japan Academy Prize, and a nomination for Best Foreign Language Film at the 71st Golden Globe Awards. Howl's Moving Castle and The Wind Rises were nominated for Best Animated Feature at the 78th and 86th Academy Awards. Miyazaki was awarded the Academy Honorary Award in November 2014, for his impact on animation and cinema.

Films

The Castle of Cagliostro 
The Castle of Cagliostro was released in Japan on December 15, 1979.

Nausicaä of the Valley of the Wind 
Nausicaä of the Valley of the Wind was released on March 11, 1984. It grossed ¥1.48 billion at the box office, and made an additional ¥742 million in distribution income.

Laputa: Castle in the Sky 
Laputa: Castle in the Sky was released on August 2, 1986. It was the highest-grossing animation film of the year in Japan.

My Neighbor Totoro 
My Neighbor Totoro was released on April 16, 1988. While it was commercially unsuccessful at the box office, merchandising was successful, and it received critical acclaim.

Kiki's Delivery Service 
Kiki's Delivery Service premiered on July 29, 1989. It earned ¥2.15 billion at the box office, and was the highest-grossing film in Japan in 1989.

Porco Rosso 
Porco Rosso was released on July 18, 1992. The film was critically and commercially successful, remaining the highest-grossing animated film in Japan for several years.

Princess Mononoke 
Princess Mononoke was released on July 12, 1997. It was critically and commercially successful, earning a domestic total of ¥14 billion (US$148 million), and becoming the highest-grossing film in Japan for several months. Upon its release in Western markets, it was largely unsuccessful at the box office, grossing about US$3 million,

Spirited Away 
Spirited Away was released on July 20, 2001; it received critical acclaim, and is considered among the greatest films of the 2000s. The film was also commercially successful, earning ¥30.4 billion (US$289.1 million) at the box office. It is the highest-grossing film in Japan.

Howl's Moving Castle 

Howl's Moving Castle was released on November 20, 2004, and received widespread critical acclaim. In Japan, the film grossed a record $14.5 million in its first week of release. It remains among the highest-grossing films in Japan, with a worldwide gross of over ¥19.3 billion.

Ponyo 
Ponyo was released on July 19, 2008. The film was also a commercial success, earning ¥10 billion (US$93.2 million) in its first month and ¥15.5 billion by the end of 2008, placing it among the highest-grossing films in Japan.

The Wind Rises 
The Wind Rises premiered on July 20, 2013, and received critical acclaim. It was also commercially successful, grossing ¥11.6 billion (US$110 million) at the Japanese box office, becoming the highest-grossing film in Japan in 2013.

Other works

Notes

References

Sources 

 
 
 
 
 
 
 
 
 
 
 
 
 
 
 
 
 
 
 
 
 
 
 
 
 
 
 
 
 
 
 
 

 
 
 
 
 

 
 
 
 
 
 
 
 
 
 
 
 
 
 
 
 
 
 

 
 
 
 
 
 
 
 
 
 
 

 
 
 
 
 
 
 
 

 
 
 
 
 
 
 
 
 
 

 
 
 
 
 
 

Accolades
Miyazaki, Hayao